ECJ is the European Court of Justice, the highest court in the European Union in matters of European Union law.

ECJ may also refer to:

Computing
 Java Evolutionary Computation Toolkit, a Java-based evolutionary Computation Research System
 Eclipse Compiler for Java, a Java compiler in the Eclipse framework

Other uses
 Eclipse ECJ, a very light jet produced by Eclipse Aviation
 Escuela Complementaria Japonesa de Madrid, a Japanese international school in Madrid
 Evolutionary Computation Journal, a scientific journal on evolutionary computation

See also
 Court of Justice of the European Union (CJEC), the full court system of the European Union